The Guardian Council, (also called Council of Guardians or Constitutional Council) is an appointed and constitutionally mandated 12-member council that wields considerable power and influence in the Islamic Republic of Iran.

The constitution of the Islamic Republic gives the council three mandates: 
a) veto power over legislation passed by the parliament (Majles); 
b) supervision of elections; and 
c) approving or disqualifying candidates seeking to run in local, parliamentary, presidential, or Assembly of Experts elections.
The Iranian constitution calls for the council to be composed of six Islamic faqihs (experts in Islamic Law), "conscious of the present needs and the issues of the day" to be selected by the Supreme Leader of Iran, and six jurists, "specializing in different areas of law, to be elected by the Majlis (the Iranian Parliament) from among the Muslim jurists nominated by the  Chief Justice" (who, in turn, is also appointed by the Supreme Leader).

The Council has played a central role in controlling the interpretation of Islamic values in Iranian law in the following ways: 
As part of its vetting of potential candidates to determine who can and cannot run for national office, it has disqualified reform-minded candidates—including the most well-known candidates—from running for office;
Vetoes laws passed by the popularly elected Majlis.
Has increased the influence that the Islamic Revolutionary Guard Corps (an ideological fighting force separate from the Iranian army) has on the economic and cultural life of the country.

When the 2009 presidential election was announced, popular former president Mohammad Khatami would not discuss his plans to run against Mahmoud Ahmadinejad, for the Council might have disqualified Khatami as it had other reformists' candidatures, on the grounds that they were not dedicated enough to Islamic values.

There have also been instances where the Constitutional Council reversed its ban on particular people after being ordered to do so by Khamenei.

Legislative functions
The Majlis has no legal status without the Constitutional Council. Any bill passed by the Majlis must be reviewed and approved by the Constitutional Council to become law.

According to Article 96 of the constitution, the Constitutional Council holds absolute veto power over all legislation approved by the Majlis. It can nullify a law based on two accounts: being against Islamic laws, or being against the constitution. While all the members vote on the laws being compatible with the constitution, only the six clerics vote on them being compatible with Islam.

If any law is rejected, it will be passed back to the Majlis for correction. If the Majlis and the Council of Guardians cannot agree on a case, it is passed up to the Expediency Council for a decision.

The Constitutional Council is uniquely involved in the legislative process, with equal oversight with regards to economic law and social policy, including such controversial topics as abortion. Chapter 6 of the Constitution explains its interworkings with the Islamic Consultative Assembly. Articles 91-97 all fall into the legislative Chapter 6.

Judicial authority
The Council of Guardians also functions similar to a constitutional court. The authority to interpret the constitution is vested in the Council. Interpretative decisions require a three-quarters majority. The Council does not conduct a court hearing where opposing sides are argued.

Electoral authority
Since 1991, all candidates of parliamentary or presidential elections, as well as candidates for the Assembly of Experts, have to be qualified by the Constitutional Council in order to run in the election.  For major elections, it typically disqualifies most candidates, as seen in the 2009 election, where out of the 476 men and women applied to the Constitutional Council to seek the presidency, only four were approved.

The Council is accorded "supervision of elections". The Constitutional Council interprets the term supervision in Article 99 of the Iranian Constitution as "approbation supervision" (naẓārat-e istiṣwābī) which implies the right to accept or reject the legality of elections and the competency of candidates. This interpretation is in contrast with the idea of "notification supervision" (naẓārat-e istitlā‘ī) which does not imply the mentioned approval right. The "evidentiary supervision" (naẓārat-e istinādī), which requires evidences for acceptance or rejection of elections legality and candidates competency, is another interpretation of mentioned article.

Role in the 2009 elections

On Monday June 29, 2009, the Constitutional Council certified the results of the controversial election in which President Mahmoud Ahmadinejad was elected. The Council had completed a recount of 10 percent of the overall votes in order to appease the citizens of Iran. As the "final authority on the election", the Council has declared the election closed. The certification of the results set off a wave of protests, disregarding the Iranian government's ban on street marches.

Criticism

Increases the role of the IRGC in everyday politics 
The Council favors military candidates at the expense of reform candidates. This ensures that the ideological Islamic Revolutionary Guard Corps (separate from the Iranian army) holds a commanding influence over the political, economic, and cultural life of Iran.

Arbitrary disqualifications of candidates from elections 
Hadi Khamenei, the brother of Supreme Leader Ali Khamenei and an adviser in the administration of reformist former President Mohammad Khatami, has said the Constitutional Council's vetting of candidates threatens Iranian democracy. He believes some reformist candidates are wrongly kept from running. In 1998, the Constitutional Council rejected Hadi Khamenei's candidacy for a seat in the Assembly of Experts for "insufficient theological qualifications".

After conservative candidates fared poorly in the 2000 parliamentary elections, the Council disqualified more than 3,600 reformist and independent candidates for the 2004 elections.

In the run-up to the 2006 Iranian Assembly of Experts election, all female candidates were disqualified.

The Council disqualified many candidates in the 2008 parliamentary elections. One third of them were members of the outgoing parliament it had previously approved. The Iranian Ministry of the Interior reasons for disqualification included narcotics addiction or involvement in drug-smuggling, connections to the Shah's pre-revolutionary government, lack of belief in or insufficient practice of Islam, being "against" the Islamic Republic, or having connections to foreign intelligence services.

Rule by unelected leaders 
This unelected Council frequently vetoes bills passed by the popularly elected legislature. It repeatedly vetoes bills that are in favour of women’s rights, electoral reform, the prohibition of torture and ratification of international human rights treaties.

Rigging results after elections in favor of conservatives 
The Guardian Council has been criticized for ousting pro-Reform candidates who had won their elections, without providing legal justification or factual evidence. Examples of such interventions by the Guardian Council are: 
 Annulment of the results in Khoy and Eslamabad-e Gharb (2000).
 Rahman Kargosha (2000, Arak), certain ballots were voided in order to declare the conservative incumbent as the winner.
 Alireza Rajaei (2000, Tehran), certain ballots were voided in order to declare the conservative incumbent as the winner.
 Minoo Khaleghi (2016, Isfahan), disqualified after winning the election.
 Khaled Zamzamnejad (2016, Bandar Lengeh), election annulled.
 Beytollah Abdollahi (2016, Ahar and Heris), election annulled.

Composition
The Council is composed of Islamic clerics and lawyers. Membership is for phased six-year terms: half the membership changes every three years.

The Supreme Leader (Iran's Head of State) directly appoints the six clerics, and may dismiss them at will. The head of the judicial system of Iran nominates six lawyers for confirmation by the Majlis.

On March 13, 2021, the Iranian Constitutional Council officially launched its English service.The English website was inaugurated during the regular monthly press briefing of the spokesman of the Constitutional Council, Abbas-Ali Kadkhodaei, in Tehran. The website, https://www.shora-gc.ir/en, has five main sections: News, Multimedia, Members, Legislation, and the Constitution.

Membership

Current members

Historic membership

See also

History of political Islam in Iran

References

External links
The official website of the ConstitutionalCouncil 
Photos of members from official website  

Government of Iran
Law of Iran
Constitutional courts
Iran
Sharia in Iran
Legislature of Iran
Politics of Iran
Revolutionary institutions of the Islamic Republic of Iran